Protolamna is an extinct genus of mackerel shark from the Cretaceous Period. The genus is known from Europe, Asia and North America.

Species 
Seven species are currently attributed to this genus, including the following:
 P. borodini  (Maastrichtian, New Jersey)
 P. carteri (Cenomanian, Texas)
 P. compressidens (Turonian-Coniacian, Belgium, France, Texas)
 P. gigantea (Cenomanian, Minnesota)
 P. ricaurtei (Barremian-Aptian Paja Formation, Colombia)
 P. roanokeensis (Albian, Texas)
 P. sokolovi (Aptian-Albian, Russia)

References

Bibliography 
 

Lamniformes
Prehistoric shark genera
Cretaceous fish of Europe
Fossils of Belgium
Fossils of France
Fossils of Russia
Cretaceous fish of North America
Fossils of the United States
Cretaceous fish of South America
Cretaceous Colombia
Fossils of Colombia
Paja Formation
Fossil taxa described in 1980